Approximants are speech sounds that involve the articulators approaching each other but not narrowly enough nor with enough articulatory precision to create turbulent airflow. Therefore, approximants fall between fricatives, which do produce a turbulent airstream, and vowels, which produce no turbulence.

Terminology

Before Peter Ladefoged coined the term "approximant" in the 1960s, the terms "frictionless continuant" and "semivowel" were used to refer to non-lateral approximants.

In phonology, "approximant" is also a distinctive feature that encompasses all sonorants except nasals, including vowels, taps and trills.

Semivowels

Some approximants resemble vowels in acoustic and articulatory properties and the terms semivowel and glide are often used for these non-syllabic vowel-like segments. The correlation between semivowels and vowels is strong enough that cross-language differences between semivowels correspond with the differences between their related vowels.

Vowels and their corresponding semivowels alternate in many languages depending on the phonological environment, or for grammatical reasons, as is the case with Indo-European ablaut. Similarly, languages often avoid configurations where a semivowel precedes its corresponding vowel. A number of phoneticians distinguish between semivowels and approximants by their location in a syllable. Although he uses the terms interchangeably,  remarks that, for example, the final glides of English par and buy differ from French par ('through') and baille ('tub') in that, in the latter pair, the approximants appear in the syllable coda, whereas, in the former, they appear in the syllable nucleus. This means that opaque (if not minimal) contrasts can occur in languages like Italian (with the i-like sound of piede 'foot', appearing in the nucleus: , and that of piano 'plan', appearing in the syllable onset) and Spanish (with a near minimal pair being abyecto  'abject' and abierto  'opened').
{|class="wikitable"
|-
|+Approximant-vowel correspondences
! Vowel
! Correspondingapproximant
! Place of articulation
! Example
|-
|  || ** || Palatal || Spanish amplío ('I extend') vs. amplió ('he extended')
|-
|  ||  || Labiopalatal || French aigu ('sharp') vs. aiguille ('needle')
|-
|  || ** || Velar || 
|-
|  ||  || Labiovelar || Spanish continúo ('I continue') vs. continuó ('he continued')
|-
|  ||  || Pharyngeal || 
|-
|  ||  || Postalveolar, retroflex ||North American English waiter vs. waitress
|}

 Because of the articulatory complexities of the American English rhotic, there is some variation in its phonetic description. A transcription with the IPA character for an alveolar approximant is common, though the sound is more postalveolar. Actual retroflexion may occur as well and both occur as variations of the same sound.
 Because the vowels  are articulated with spread lips, spreading is implied for their approximant analogues, . However, these sounds generally have little or no lip-spreading. The fricative letters with a lowering diacritic, may therefore be justified for a neutral articulation between spread  and rounded .

In articulation and often diachronically, palatal approximants correspond to front vowels, velar approximants to back vowels, and labialized approximants to rounded vowels. In American English, the rhotic approximant corresponds to the rhotic vowel. This can create alternations (as shown in the above table).

In addition to alternations, glides can be inserted to the left or the right of their corresponding vowels when they occur next to a hiatus. For example, in Ukrainian, medial  triggers the formation of an inserted  that acts as a syllable onset so that when the affix  is added to футбол ('football') to make футболіст 'football player', it is pronounced , but маоїст ('Maoist'), with the same affix, is pronounced  with a glide. Dutch for many speakers has a similar process that extends to mid vowels:
 bioscoop →  ('cinema')
 zee + en →  ('seas')
 fluor →  ('fluorine')
 reu + en →  ('male dogs')
 Rwanda →  ('Rwanda')
 Boaz →  ('Boaz')

Similarly, vowels can be inserted next to their corresponding glide in certain phonetic environments. Sievers' law describes this behaviour for Germanic.

Non-high semivowels also occur. In colloquial Nepali speech, a process of glide-formation occurs, where one of two adjacent vowels becomes non-syllabic; the process includes mid vowels so that  ('cause to wish') features a non-syllabic mid vowel. Spanish features a similar process and even nonsyllabic  can occur so that ahorita ('right away') is pronounced . It is not often clear, however, whether such sequences involve a semivowel (a consonant) or a diphthong (a vowel), and in many cases, it may not be a meaningful distinction.

Although many languages have central vowels , which lie between back/velar  and front/palatal , there are few cases of a corresponding approximant . An example is liq  (?) ('white').

Approximants versus fricatives
In addition to less turbulence, approximants also differ from fricatives in the precision required to produce them. When emphasized, approximants may be slightly fricated (that is, the airstream may become slightly turbulent), which is reminiscent of fricatives. For example, the Spanish word ayuda ('help') features a palatal approximant that is pronounced as a fricative in emphatic speech. Spanish can be analyzed as having a meaningful distinction between fricative, approximant, and intermediate . However, such frication is generally slight and intermittent, unlike the strong turbulence of fricative consonants.

For places of articulation further back in the mouth, languages do not contrast voiced fricatives and approximants. Therefore, the IPA allows the symbols for the voiced fricatives to double for the approximants, with or without a lowering diacritic.

Occasionally, the glottal "fricatives" are called approximants, since  typically has no more frication than voiceless approximants, but they are often phonations of the glottis without any accompanying manner or place of articulation.

Central approximants

bilabial approximant  (usually transcribed )
labiodental approximant 
dental approximant  (usually transcribed )
alveolar approximant 
retroflex approximant  (a consonantal )
palatal approximant  (a consonantal )
velar approximant  (a consonantal )
uvular approximant  (usually transcribed )
pharyngeal approximant  (a consonantal ; usually transcribed )
breathy-voiced glottal approximant 
creaky-voiced glottal approximant

Lateral approximants
In lateral approximants, the center of tongue makes solid contact with the roof of the mouth. However, the defining location is the side of the tongue, which only approaches the teeth, allowing free passage of air.

 voiced alveolar lateral approximant 
 retroflex lateral approximant 
 voiced palatal lateral approximant 
 velar lateral approximant 
 uvular lateral approximant

Coarticulated approximants with dedicated IPA symbols

labialized velar approximant  (a consonantal )
labialized palatal approximant  (a consonantal )

Voiceless approximants
Voiceless approximants are not recognized by all phoneticians as a discrete phonetic category. There are problems in distinguishing voiceless approximants from voiceless fricatives.

Phonetic characteristics 
Fricative consonants are generally said to be the result of turbulent airflow at a place of articulation in the vocal tract. More recent research distinguishes between "turbulent" and "laminar" airflow in the vocal tract. It is not clear if it is possible to describe voiceless approximants categorically as having laminar airflow (or cavity friction in Pike's terms) as a way of distinguishing them from fricatives.  write that "the airflow for voiced approximants remains laminar (smooth), and does not become turbulent. Voiceless approximants are rare in the languages of the world, but when they do occur the airflow is usually somewhat turbulent."

Distinctiveness 
Voiceless approximants are rarely if ever distinguished phonemically from voiceless fricatives in the sound system of a language.  discuss the issue and conclude "In practice, it is difficult to distinguish between a voiceless approximant and a voiceless fricative at the same place of articulation ... there is no evidence that any language in the world makes such a distinction crucial."

Disagreement over use of the term 
However, the term voiceless approximant is seen by some phoneticians as controversial. It has been pointed out that if approximant is defined as a speech sound that involves the articulators approaching each other but not narrowly enough to create turbulent airflow, then it is difficult to see how a voiceless approximant could be audible. As John C. Wells puts it in his blog, "voiceless approximants are by definition inaudible ... If there's no friction and no voicing, there's nothing to hear." A similar point is made in relation to frictionless continuants by : "There are no voiceless frictionless continuants because this would imply silence; the voiceless counterpart of the frictionless continuant is the voiceless fricative."  argue that the increased airflow arising from voicelessness alone makes a voiceless continuant a fricative, even if lacking a greater constriction in the oral cavity than a voiced approximant.

 argue that Burmese and Standard Tibetan have voiceless lateral approximants  and Navajo and Zulu voiceless lateral fricatives , but also say that "in other cases it is difficult to decide whether a voiceless lateral should be described as an approximant or a fricative".  compared voiceless laterals in Estonian Swedish, Icelandic, and Welsh and found that Welsh-speakers consistently used , that Icelandic-speakers consistently used , and that speakers of Estonian Swedish varied in their pronunciation. They conclude that there is "a range of variants within voiceless laterals, rather than a categorical split between lateral fricatives and voiceless approximant laterals".

Nasalized approximants
(Not to be confused with 'nasal continuant', which is a synonym for nasal consonant)

Examples are:
nasal palatal approximant 
nasal labialized velar approximant 
voiceless nasal glottal approximant 

What are transcribed as nasal approximants may include non-syllabic elements of nasal vowels or diphthongs.

See also

 Liquid consonant
 List of phonetics topics
 Semivowel

Notes

References

Manner of articulation